Jhansi Division is one of 18 divisions of Uttar Pradesh state in northern India.  The city of Jhansi is the administrative center. The division is part of the historic Bundelkhand region, which includes a portion of southern Uttar Pradesh and extends into neighboring Madhya Pradesh state.

Jhansi Division is subdivided into three districts:
Jhansi District
Jalaun District
Lalitpur District

See also
 Districts of Uttar Pradesh

Bundelkhand
Divisions of Uttar Pradesh
Jhansi division